KKCW (103.3 MHz, "K103") is a commercial FM radio station licensed to Beaverton, Oregon and serving the Portland metropolitan area.  It is owned by iHeartMedia and airs an adult contemporary radio format.  From mid-November to the 31st of December (to the end of December) each year, it switches to all-Christmas music.  The studios and offices are on SW 68th Parkway in Tigard, while the transmitter is located off Northwest Skyline Boulevard in Portland's West Hills, amid the towers for other local FM and TV stations.  KKCW broadcasts in the HD Radio hybrid format.

History
In 1984, the Columbia-Willamette Broadcasting Company acquired and built out the license for a new FM station for Portland licensed to Beaverton. It intended to sign on the station with a country music format, and the "CW" in the station's calls would have held a dual meaning for 'country and western' had it gone to plan. 

KUPL (98.7), which had been an easy listening station on FM, instead had the country format airing on sister station 1330 AM KUPL bumped to 98.7 on February 24, 1984. Thus, KKCW instead went on the air with a soft adult contemporary format and de facto traded formats with KUPL. KKCW has never changed its format since sign-on, outside adjustments to fit industry trends.

In 1986, the station was sold to Trumper Communications of Portland. San Antonio-based Clear Channel acquired the station in 1999.

HD programming
The station currently does not carry any HD Radio subchannels outside an HD1 simulcast, though it had two subchannels in the past.

KKCW-HD2
From August 2007 until 2019, an automated smooth jazz format with a resemblance to that of KIJZ, which switched to oldies after that point, was programmed. It eventually took the automated playlist heard on the iHeartRadio web/app Smooth Jazz channel until its demise.

KKCW-HD3
The channel carried the Educational Media Foundation's Air1 Christian worship music network, which was also relayed on FM translator K224DL (92.7 FM), until November 2019. Air1 then moved to KLVP-HD2 after that station was moved into the Portland market, which is translated by K235CU (94.9).

References

External links
K103 KKCW official website
K103 page on PDXRadio.com

KCW
Mainstream adult contemporary radio stations in the United States
Radio stations established in 1984
1984 establishments in Oregon
IHeartMedia radio stations